For the school of the same name in Quetta, Pakistan, see St Francis Grammar School.

St Francis RC Grammar School, also known as St Francis Xavier Grammar School, was a Catholic grammar school for boys, in Hartlepool, County Durham, England. It opened on 17 September 1956 and was subsumed into The English Martyrs School and Sixth Form College along with St Joseph's Convent School and four more local Catholic schools in 1973. It was run by the Xaverian Brothers.

Head Teachers

Teachers and Brothers

Houses
There were four houses within the school: Percy, Swalwell, Errington, and Thirkeld. In the same way as the later English Martyrs School and Sixth Form College would name its houses after the English Martyrs, the houses of St Francis Grammar School were named after the following:

Percy
Thomas Percy, the 7th Earl of Northumberland who was executed in York in 1572.

Swalwell
John Swalwell, who can be found on the list of abbots of Monkwearmouth-Jarrow Abbey as Master of Wearmouth in 1526 and Master of Jarrow in 1531.

Errington
Roman Catholic churchman, George Errington (martyr), executed at York in 1596.

Thirkeld
Roman Catholic priest, Richard Thirkeld, also executed at York in 1583.

Sites

Woodlands
 Wooler Road, the main site.

Normanhurst
 Grange Road. Now a pub known as 'The White House'.

Notable alumni
 John Darwin.
 Jez Lowe.

Reunion Groups
 Over 150 members plus photos: http://www.schoolfriends.com.au/School.page/St_Francis_Xavier/10822/Details
 Over 100 members: http://www.friendsreunited.com/School.page/St_Francis_Grammar_School/411118/Details

References 

Defunct schools in the Borough of Hartlepool
Defunct grammar schools in England
Defunct Catholic schools in the Diocese of Hexham and Newcastle
Educational institutions established in 1956
1956 establishments in England
Educational institutions disestablished in 1973
1973 disestablishments in England